"Je danse le Mia" is a 1994 popular song recorded by the French hip hop band IAM. It was released as the first single from their second album, Ombre est Lumière, in February 1994. The song became a major hit in France, reaching #1, and is often considered the signature song of the band.

Music, lyrics and music video
"Je danse le Mia" (a play on the name of the band, IAM) was written and composed by IAM: rappers Akhenaton, Shurik'n, DJ Kheops, and DJ/beat maker Imhotep.

It used a sample from George Benson's song, "Give Me the Night" (which was also used in 2005 by Jean Dujardin with his song "Le Casse de Brice"). This song, which has a "joyful, nostalgic and funky melody", is not representative of the musical universe of the group, which is traditionally characterized by "pessimistic texts" and "most slightly acid musics". Nevertheless, the real theme of the song is not dancing and nightclubs, but the collapse of time represented by nostalgia for the 'Eighties and dance

The music video, produced by Michel Gondry, shows the lead singer in various situations, most notably dancing in a nightclub. Throughout the video, after an image is shown, the camera then makes several successive zooms ins or zoom outs. Many other band members and extras also appear in the video.

Chart performances
In France, "Je danse le Mia" spent 32 weeks on the chart in 1994. It debuted at #44, but climbed quickly on the chart, reaching number-one only three weeks later. It stayed at the top for eight non-consecutive weeks, alternating with Bruce Springsteen's "Streets of Philadelphia". The single managed to remain in the top ten for 22 weeks. Certified Gold disc by the SNEP, it featured at #2 on the End of the Year Chart, behind "7 Seconds", by Youssou N'Dour and Neneh Cherry. It re-charted for one week in 2001, then for two weeks in 2004, but stayed at the bottom of the top 100.

The song was covered by Les Enfoirés on their album 2011: Dans l'œil des Enfoirés, and included in the medley "À la porte du Night Club". The song has been performed by Grégoire & Thomas Dutronc.

Track listings
 CD single
 "Je danse le Mia" (le terrible funk remix radio edit)
 "Je danse le Mia" (original version)

 CD maxi
 "Je danse le Mia" — 4:34
 "Ombre est Lumière" — 5:28
 "Je fais 1 avec ma musique" — 5:17
 "L'Ultra Mia" — 4:12

 Cassette
 "Je danse le Mia" (le terrible funk remix radio edit)  
 "Je danse le Mia" (original version)

 12" maxi
 "Je danse le Mia" (le terrible funk remix radio edit)
 "Je danse le Mia" (instrumental)
 "Ombre est Lumière"
 "Je fais 1 avec ma musique"

Certifications

Charts

References

External links
 "Je danse le Mia", lyrics
  "Je danse le Mia", music video

1994 singles
IAM (band) songs
SNEP Top Singles number-one singles
1994 songs